BBC Hindi is an international news service that broadcasts in the Hindi language. It started on 11 May 1940. Initially, the service operated through radio. Currently, it is operated on audio as well as website, TV and social networks. On 2 December 2021, the BBC released its annual report showing the number of listeners, viewers and users, according to which India has the largest number of people using BBC services in the world.

In March 2015, BBC Hindi was criticised for broadcasting a documentary interviewing one of the rapists in India, despite a ban ordered by the Indian High Court. In 2017, BBC Hindi was banned for a period of five years from covering all national parks and sanctuaries in India.

References 

Hindi-language mass media
BBC